HMS Vanguard was a 70-gun third rate ship of the line of the Royal Navy, launched on 16 April 1748. She was built by Philemon Ewer at his East Cowes yard on the Isle of Wight to the draught specified by the 1745 Establishment, at a cost of £8,009. She was the fourth vessel of the Royal Navy to bear the name Vanguard.

She took part in the capture of Louisbourg in 1758 under Admiral Edward Boscawen, and in the capture of Quebec in 1759 under Admiral Charles Saunders.

The Atlante, commanded by Jean Vauquelin, and the Pomone sunk, and the important personnel were taken prisoner. In 1762, under the command of Sir George Rodney, she took part in the capture of Martinique.

Vanguard was sold out of the navy in 1774.

Notes

References

Lavery, Brian (2003) The Ship of the Line – Volume 1: The development of the battlefleet 1650–1850. Conway Maritime Press. .

Ships of the line of the Royal Navy
1748 ships